D. inornatus may refer to:
 Dendrelaphis inornatus, a snake species in the genus Dendrelaphis
 Drymoips inornatus, a bird species in the genus Drymoips

See also
 Inornatus